Discovery-driven planning is a planning technique first introduced in a Harvard Business Review article by Rita Gunther McGrath and Ian C. MacMillan in 1995 and subsequently referenced in a number of books and articles. Its main thesis is that when one is operating in arenas with significant amounts of uncertainty, that a different approach applies than is normally used in conventional planning. In conventional planning, the correctness of a plan is generally judged by how close outcomes come to projections. In discovery-driven planning, it is assumed that plan parameters may change as new information is revealed. With conventional planning, it is considered appropriate to fund the entire project, as the expectation is that one can predict a positive outcome. In discovery-driven planning, funds are released based on the accomplishment of key milestones or checkpoints, at which point additional funding can be made available predicated on reasonable expectations for future success. Conventional project management tools, such as stage-gate models or the use of financial tools to assess innovation, have been found to be flawed in that they are not well suited for the uncertainty of innovation-oriented projects 

Discovery-driven planning has been widely used in entrepreneurship curricula and has recently been cited by Steve Blank as a foundational idea in the lean startup methodology

Five disciplines 

A discovery-driven plan incorporates five disciplines or plan elements:
 Definition of success for the plan or initiative, including a "reverse" income statement
 Benchmarking against market and competitive parameters
 Specification of operational requirements
 Documentation of assumptions
 Specification of key checkpoints

Using discovery-driven planning, it is often possible to iterate the ideas in a plan, encouraging experimentation at lowest possible cost. The methodology is consistent with the application of real options reasoning to business planning, in which ventures are considered "real" options. A real option is a small investment made today which buys the right, but not the obligation to make further investments.

See also 
 Assumption-based planning
 The Innovator's Dilemma

External links
 Web site with additional reference material

References 

Business planning
Strategic management